Neville Veale (born 1939) was an Australian racing cyclist. He won the Australian national road race title in 1961.

In 2015 he was inducted into the Goldfields Sporting Hall Of Fame.

References

External links
 

1939 births
Living people
Australian male cyclists
Place of birth missing (living people)